Brahim Zafour (in kabyle: Brahim Zafur; born 30 November 1977 in Tizi Ouzou) is a former Algerian football player.

He was a member of the Algerian 2004 African Nations Cup team, who finished second in their group in the first round of competition before being defeated by Morocco in the quarter-finals.

National team statistics

Honours
Won the CAF Cup three times in 2000, 2001 and 2002 with JS Kabylie
Won the Algerian league twice in 2004 and 2008 with JS Kabylie
Runner up in the Algerian league twice in 2002 and 2005 with JS Kabylie
Finalist of the Algerian Cup in 2004 with JS Kabylie
Finalist of the North African Cup Winners Cup in 2009 North African Cup Winners Cup

References

External links
 

1977 births
Living people
Footballers from Tizi Ouzou
Kabyle people
Algerian footballers
Algeria international footballers
JS Kabylie players
Expatriate footballers in Qatar
Algerian expatriate footballers
JSM Béjaïa players
Al-Sailiya SC players
Algerian expatriate sportspeople in Qatar
Algerian Ligue Professionnelle 1 players
Qatar Stars League players
2002 African Cup of Nations players
2004 African Cup of Nations players
Association football defenders
21st-century Algerian people